Kağan Timurcin Konuk (born 1 October 1990) is a  Turkish professional footballer who plays for Şanlıurfaspor.

References

External links 

1990 births
Living people
Turkish footballers
Sivasspor footballers
Süper Lig players
TFF First League players
Sportspeople from Malatya
Association football midfielders